The black-lyre leafroller moth ("Cnephasia" jactatana)  is a tortrix moth species of the family Tortricidae.

Distribution
The black-lyre leafroller moth is endemic to New Zealand and is common throughout the country.

Taxonomy
It belongs to the subfamily Tortricinae and therein to tribe Cnephasiini. But among these, it is in fact not close enough to the type species of Cnephasia – Cnephasia pasiuana of Europe – to properly belong in that genus. Alternatively, it has variously been referred to Batodes (= Ditula) or Paedisca (= Epinotia); if anything it might belong to the latter, presently circumscribed as a large and wide-ranging group of uncertain monophyly. But its actual genus has yet to be determined with certainty.

Synonyms
Junior synonyms of this species are:
 Batodes jactatana Walker, 1863
 Sciaphila flexivittana Walker, 1863
 Paedisca privatana Walker, 1863
 Paedisca voluta Felder & Rogenhofer, 1875

Life cycle and behaviour 
The eggs are laid on the topside of the leaf. The larvae of this species can commonly be found on the hounds tongue fern in a silken tube, feeding on the leaves of that fern. They prefer older leaves.

Interactions with humans 
The species is primarily known as a pest of kiwifruit (Actinidia deliciosa), but the caterpillars feed on various other trees with fleshy fruit, such as Citrus, hawthorns (Crataegus), persimmons and ebonies (Diospyros), gum trees (Eucalyptus), fuchsias (Fuchsia) and grapevines (Vitis). They primarily feed on the leaves, but can also damage the husk and fruit body.

Gallery

Footnotes

References

  (2009): Online World Catalogue of the Tortricidae – "Cnephasia" jactatana. Version 1.3.1. Retrieved 2009-JAN-20.
  (2003): Oviposition behaviour of "Cnephasia" jactatana Walker (Lepidoptera: Tortricidae) on kiwifruit. New Zealand Entomologist 26(1): 109-111. PDF fulltext
  (2002): Adult Activity Patterns of Cnephasia jactatana Walker (Lepidoptera: Tortricidae). New Zealand Plant Protection 55: 374-379. PDF fulltext

Tortricinae
Moths of New Zealand
Moths described in 1863
Endemic fauna of New Zealand
Taxa named by Francis Walker (entomologist)
Kiwifruit
Endemic moths of New Zealand